The doctrine of the affections, also known as the doctrine of affects, doctrine of the passions, theory of the affects, or by the German term Affektenlehre (after the German Affekt; plural Affekte) was a theory in the aesthetics of painting, music, and theatre, widely used in the Baroque era (1600–1750). Literary theorists of that age, by contrast, rarely discussed the details of what was called "pathetic composition", taking it for granted that a poet should be required to "wake the soul by tender strokes of art" (Alexander Pope, cited in ). The doctrine was derived from ancient theories of rhetoric and oratory . Some pieces or movements of music express one Affekt throughout; however, a skillful composer like Johann Sebastian Bach could express different affects within a movement  .

History and definition 

The doctrine of the affections was an elaborate theory based on the idea that the passions could be represented by their outward visible or audible signs. It drew largely on elements with a long previous history, but first came to general prominence in the mid-seventeenth century amongst the French scholar-critics associated with the Court of Versailles, helping to place it at the centre of artistic activity for all of Europe.  The term itself, however, was only first devised in the twentieth century by German musicologists Hermann Kretzschmar, Harry Goldschmidt, and Arnold Schering, to describe this aesthetic theory.

René Descartes held that there were six basic affects, which can be combined into numerous intermediate forms 
:
 Admiration (admiration)
 Amour (love)
 Haine (hatred)
 Désir (desire)
 Joie (joy)
 Tristesse (sorrow)

Another authority also mentions sadness, anger, and jealousy. These were attributed to the physiological effects of humors. Lorenzo Giacomini (1552–1598) in his Orationi e discorsi defined an affection as "a spiritual movement or operation of the mind in which it is attracted or repelled by an object it has come to know as a result of an imbalance in the animal spirits and vapours that flow continually throughout the body"  . Descartes also proposed that the affections were reliant upon humors. Contemporary beliefs were that the humors' consistency or location could be affected by external factors. This allowed for an expectation of contemporary art to have an objective physical effect on its consumer .

"Affections are not the same as emotions; however, they are a spiritual movement of the mind" .

A prominent Baroque proponent of the Doctrine of the Affections was Johann Mattheson .

Examples for affects and corresponding musical figures 

References
 Aristotle (1959). Ars rhetorica, edited and translated by William David Ross. Scriptorum Classicorum Bibliotheca Oxoniensis. Publisher: Oxford: Clarendon Press.
 .
 . London: Macmillan Publishers.
 .
 .

 

 
 . Vol. 1 Vol. 2. Facsimile reprint, with a foreword and indexes by Ulf Scharlau, 2 vols. in 1. Hildesheim and New York: G. Olms, 1970.
 
 .
  Facsimile reprint of the copy preserved in the  Bibliothèque des arts et métiers, with annotations by the author, with an introduction by François Lesure, 3 vols. Paris: Centre national de la recherche scientifique, 1963.
 
 .
 .
Quintilian (1920–22). The Instituto Oratoria of Quintilian, edited and translated by Harold Edgeworth Butler, 4 vols. Loeb Classical Library 124–27. Cambridge, Mass.: Harvard University Press; London: W. Heinemann.

Further reading
 Bayreuther, Rainer (2005). "Theorie der musikalischen Affektivität in der Frühen Neuzeit". In Musiktheoretisches Denken und kultureller Kontext, edited by Dörte Schmidt, 69–92. Forum Musikwissenschaft 1. Schliengen: Edition Argus. .
 Bartel, Dietrich (2003). "Ethical Gestures: Rhetoric in German Baroque Music". The Musical Times 144, no. 1885 (Winter): 15–19.
Campe, Rüdiger. Affekt und Ausdruck. Zur Umwandlung der literarischen Rede im 17. und 18. Jahrhundert (Tübingen: Niemeyer, 1990).
 Bartel, Dietrich (2003). "Ethical Gestures: Rhetoric in German Baroque Music". The Musical Times 144, no. 1885 (Winter): 15–19.
 Clark, Andrew (2013). Making Music Speak. In Speaking of Music: Addressing the Sonorous, edited by Keith M. Chapin and Andrew Clark, 70–85. New York: Fordham University Press. ; .

 .
 Fubini, Enrico. 2003. "La musica e il linguaggio degli affetti". In 'Et facciam dolçi canti': Studi in onore di Agostino Ziino in occasione del suo 65° compleanno, 2 vols., edited by Bianca Maria Antolini, Maria Teresa Gialdroni, and Annunziato Pugliese, 2:1467–76. Lucca, Italy: Libreria Musicale Italiana (LIM). .
 Harriss, Ernest. 1986. "Johann Mattheson and the Affekten-, Figuren-, and Rhetoriklehren". In La musique et le rite sacré et profane, 2 vols., edited by Marc Honegger, Christian Meyer, and Paul Prévost, 517–31. Strasbourg: Association des publications près les Universités de Strasbourg. .
 .
 Koch, Klaus-Peter. 2010. "Das Malen bei Telemann mit Hilfe von Gattungen der Melodien und ihren besondern Abzeichen". In Telemann, der musikalische Maler: Telemann-Kompositionen im Notenarchiv der Sing-Akademie zu Berlin, edited by Carsten Lange and Brit Reipsch, 114–25. Telemann-Konferenzberichte, no. 15. Hildesheim: Georg Olms. .
 Krones, Hartmut (2002). "Johann Gottfried Herder: Die Affektenlehre und die Musik". In Ideen und Ideale: Johann Gottfried Herder in Ost und West, edited by Peter Andraschke and Helmut Loos, 71–88. Rombach Wissenschaften: Reihe Litterae 103. Freiburg im Breisgau: Rombach Verlag. . 
 Lachmirowicz, Ewa. 2010. "Technika wyrażania afektów według Francesca Geminianiego i Giuseppe Tartiniego". Muzyka 55 No. 4:219: 21–44.
Lippman, Edward A. (ed.). 1986. Musical Aesthetics: A Historical Reader. Volume 1: "From Antiquity to the Eighteenth Century". Aesthetics in Music 4. New York: Pendragon Press, ; 
 Mackensen, Karsten. 2008. "Sinn und System: zur Auflösung der Topik in der Erfahrung bei Johann Mattheson". In Musiktheorie im Kontext, edited by Jan Philipp Sprick, Reinhard Bahr, and Michael von Troschke, 357–72. Berlin: Weidler. .
 .
 .
 Neu, Ulrike (1995). Harmonik und Affektgestaltung in den Lautenkompositionen von Silvius Leopold Weiss. Europäische Hochschulschriften. Reihe XXXVI, Musikwissenschaft; Publications universitaires européennes. Série XXXVI, Musicologie; European university studies. Series XXXVI, Musicology 141. Frankfurt am Main and New York: P. Lang. .
 Pečman, Rudolf (2001). "C.Ph.E. Bach und die Affektenlehre: Bemerkungen zur Aufführungspraxis". In Rudolfu Pečmanovi k sedmdesátinám/Rudolf Pečman zu seinem 70. Geburtstag, edited by Peter Macek, 17–22. Musicologica brunensia: Sborník prací Filozofické Fakulty Brněnské Univerzity. H: Řada hudebněvědná, 50–51(36–37). 
 Pontremoli, Alessandro (ed.) (2003). Il volto e gli affetti: Fisiognomica ed espressione nelle arti del Rinascimento. Biblioteca dell'Archivum Romanicum. I: Storia, letteratura, paleografia 311. Florence: Leo S. Olschki. .
 Pozzi, Egidio (2009). "Il primo Settecento e la Melodielehre di Mattheson, Riepel e Kirnberger". In Storia dei concetti musicali. III: Melodia, stile, suono, edited by Gianmario Borio, 53–70. Rome: Carocci. .
 .
 Rathey, Markus (2012). "Johann Mattheson's 'Invention': Models and Influences for Rhythmic Variation in Der vollkommene Capellmeister". Dutch Journal of Music Theory/Tijdschrift voor muziektheorie 17, no. 2 (May): 77–90.
 .
Seedorf, Thomas, and Christian Schaper. 2013. Händels Arien: Form, Affekt, Kontext: Bericht über die Symposien der Internationalen Händel-Akademie Karlsruhe 2008 bis 2010. Veröffentlichungen der Internationalen Händel-Akademie Karlsruhe Bd. 10. .
 Selfridge-Field, Eleanor. 2013. "Associative Aspects of Perceived Musical Similarity and Their Intersections with Seconda-Prattica Affetti". In À Fresco: Mélanges offerts au professeur Étienne Darbellay, edited by Georges Starobinski and Brenno Boccadoro, 433–52. Bern: Peter Lang. .
Siegmund, Bert (ed.). 2003. Gestik und Affekt in der Musik des 17. und 18. Jahrhunderts: XXVIII. Internationale Wissenschaftliche Arbeitstagung, Michaelstein, 19. bis 21. Mai 2000: gewidmet dem Gedenken an Günter Fleischhauer. [Michaelstein]: Stiftung Kloster Michaelstein; Dössel: J. Stekovics, ;  (Stiftung Kloster Michaelstein);  (J. Stekovics).
 .
 ..
Stoll, Albrecht D. 1981. Figur und Affekt: zur höfischen Musik und zur bürgerlichen Musiktheorie der Epoche Richelieu, second edition. Frankfurter Beiträge zur Musikwissenschaft 4. Tutzing: H. Schneider. .
 .Ulrich Thieme
 .
 .

Baroque music